The Airport & South Line (numbered T8, coloured green) (commonly called the East Hills Line) is a suburban commuter rail line in Sydney, Australia. It connects the Sydney central business district with the southwestern suburbs via Sydney Airport. The line is part of the Sydney Trains network. The line began operating on 26 November 2017, when the T2 Airport, Inner West & South Line was split in two. Sydney Trains' predecessor CityRail operated the Airport & East Hills line over an identical route between 2000 and 2013.

History

The T8 traverses several railway lines; the City Circle, Airport Link, East Hills and Main South lines. The origins of the current train service can be traced back to the opening of the East Hills line in 1931. The East Hills line was extended to Glenfield in 1987, where it joins the Main South line. The Airport line opened in 2000, providing an additional pair of tracks into the city.

The East Hills line was opened in 1931. Electrification only extended as far as Kingsgrove. Services on the non-electrified section were by CPH railmotor, supplemented by through steam trains from Central in peak hours. The section between Kingsgrove and East Hills was opened for electric services on 17 December 1939. Services generally ran all stations from East Hills via Tempe and Sydenham, to the city. Occasional services terminated at Riverwood, Kingsgrove, and Padstow. Most trains used to stop at Erskineville and St Peters - now only served by the T3 line.

When services on the Glenfield extension commenced, there were only limited services from Campbelltown via East Hills during peak hours only; however, in 1988 an all-day half-hourly service was provided. Local (all stations) services generally ran every 15 minutes from East Hills.

Once the Airport line opened, the running patterns of trains changed. The "flying junctions" near Central Station were altered to give the Airport line its own platforms (21 & 23) at Central. Local (all stations) trains generally were timetabled to run from East Hills via the airport, peak hour express trains from Campbelltown run along the original route via Sydenham, taking newly built express tracks between Kingsgrove and Wolli Creek Junction.

The Airport line stations (except Wolli Creek) are operated by a private company, the Airport Link Company, as part of a public private partnership (PPP). Under the deal, the private company would cover the costs of building four of the stations. In return, they would operate those stations for 30 years and have the right to impose a surcharge on fares for their use. The company's involvement was predicated on passenger estimates and train reliability guarantees that later proved to be optimistic. The NSW Government would fund (and own) the railway itself and Wolli Creek station. The Airport Link consistently failed to meet patronage targets. In 2000, the Airport Link Company went into receivership, exposing the government to costs of around $800 million; it was put up for sale in early 2006. State Rail blamed "lower than expected patronage" and stated it was working with the company to increase it. In October 2005, the government and the company signed a revised agreement on revenue and patronage, settling the latter's claims against the former. The stations were purchased by Westpac. In 2009 the business made a profit of A$5.8 million. In 2010 it increased to A$9.3 million. In March 2011 it was announced that the government would cover the cost of the station access fee at Green Square and Mascot stations, meaning that passengers no longer need to pay a surcharge to access these stations. A fee remains in place for Domestic and International stations. Patronage on the link had been growing at 20% per year, but between March and June 2011 patronage increased by 70% as a result of the reduced fares.

The early 2010s saw a shift in how public transport services are delivered in New South Wales. The state government created a new transport authority, Transport for NSW, in 2011. Sydney Trains replaced CityRail as the operator of Sydney's commuter rail services in 2013. These changes saw Transport for NSW take control of the timetabling and branding of services. Transport for NSW introduced a new timetable in late 2013 that saw the Airport and East Hills Line replaced by the T2 Airport, Inner West & South Line. This new line was created by combining three of CityRail's lines. Operationally, the services between Macarthur and the city via the East Hills and Airport lines remained much the same as before.

The 2017 timetable saw the 2013 branding changes partially wound back. The T2 line was split in two. The new T2 consists of services from Leppington to the city via Granville, with a branch to Parramatta being added. Services from Macarthur to the city via Sydney Airport or Sydenham were transferred to the new T8 line. The T8 inherited the green colour of the old T2 and the Airport and East Hills Line. T5 services were also modified to no longer travel to and from Campbelltown, instead starting and terminating at Leppington. These changes mean the section of the network between Glenfield and Macarthur is served exclusively by services operating via the East Hills railway line for the first time.

Operations and stations
Apart from the Airport line's troubles, the line as a whole also suffered a substantial loss in patronage when the M5 East Tunnel opened in 2001. The tunnel joined the Eastern Distributor and M5 South Western Motorway, shortening road travel times between the city and the south-west. The line was estimated to have lost 384,450 commuters over 12 months after the tunnel opened. Since that time, however, the line appears to have gained commuters again, with a reported 3.5% increase in patronage up to early 2006.

Under the current (2020) timetable, there are generally two stopping patterns on the Airport & South Line:

 Express service: from Macarthur, stopping all stations to Revesby, then express to Wolli Creek, then all stations to the City via the Airport.
 Local service: starting at Revesby and running all stops to the City via the Airport.Some times services start at East Hills

During peak hours, there are additional express services, which skip some stops between Macquarie Fields and Revesby, but some also make additional stops at Padstow and Riverwood. Some express services also operate via Sydenham instead of the Airport. There are also a few services terminating at Turrella.

Occasionally during trackwork on the City Circle, all services will be switched to run via Sydenham in one direction only, with the other direction running via the Airport, due to limitations of the track design at Central. When there is trackwork on other lines, there will also occasionally be shuttle services running express to Kingsgrove via Sydenham.

Patronage
The following table shows the patronage of Sydney Trains network for the year ending 30 June 2022.

References

Sydney Trains
Georges River
Airport Link, Sydney